The Last Dangerous Visions is an unpublished speculative fiction anthology intended to follow Dangerous Visions (1967) and Again, Dangerous Visions (1972). Like its predecessors, it was edited by American author Harlan Ellison, with introductions to be provided by him.

Ellison died in 2018 with work on the anthology still incomplete, but on November 13, 2020, the Ellison estate's executor J. Michael Straczynski announced his intention to publish it.

Background
The projected third collection was started but, controversially, has yet to be finished. It has become something of a legend in science fiction as the genre's most famous unpublished book. It was originally announced for publication in 1973, but has not seen print to date. Ellison came under criticism for his treatment of some writers who submitted their stories to him, who some estimate to number nearly 150. Many of these writers have since died. 
 
British author Christopher Priest, whose story "An Infinite Summer" had been accepted for the collection, wrote a lengthy critique of Ellison's failure to complete the LDV project. It was first published by Priest as a one-shot fanzine called The Last Deadloss Visions, a pun on the title of Priest's fanzine Deadloss. It proved so popular that it had a total of three printings in the UK and later, in book form, as the 1995 Hugo Award for Best Related Work-nominated The Book on the Edge of Forever (an allusion to Ellison's Star Trek episode, "The City on the Edge of Forever") by American publisher Fantagraphics Books. The essay is available online at the Internet Archive mirror of the original site.

On June 28, 2018, Ellison died, with the anthology still unpublished.

J. Michael Straczynski work 

On November 13, 2020, the Ellison estate's executor J. Michael Straczynski announced on Twitter that he would oversee the project to publish the book, giving more details on Patreon. Straczynski's forthcoming volume will not include withdrawn stories and will exclude stories "overtaken by real-world events" but will include new stories from major contemporary science fiction writers as well as work from new authors, including one story from an unpublished writer. The book will conclude with "one last, significant work by Harlan which has never been published" which "ties directly into the reason why The Last Dangerous Visions has taken so long to come to light." The stories will be organized by theme and will be accompanied by artwork from Tim Kirk. The rights to all stories not used will revert to the authors.

In the initial announcement, Straczynski stated his intention to market the book to publishers in March/April 2021. He reported sending the finished manuscript to an agent in a post on September 26, 2021, with an updated word count of 112,000. On July 10, 2022, Straczynski announced on Twitter that The Last Dangerous Visions will be published on September 1, 2024 by Blackstone Publishers.

Contents
The contents of The Last Dangerous Visions were announced on several occasions beginning in 1973, with stories sometimes being added, dropped, or substituted between each announced version.  The most complete version was announced in 1979; listed were 113 previously unpublished stories by 102 authors, to be collected in three volumes.

Contents as of 1979
It was announced in the April 1979 issue of speculative fiction news magazine Locus that the anthology had been sold to Berkley Books, which planned to publish the 700,000 words of fiction in three volumes. A table of contents was published in the June 1979 issue of the publication. Story titles are followed by an approximate word count. Note that the totals given for each book do not exactly match the published list. Authors marked with a '†' are known to have died since submitting their work to Ellison. Stories marked with a '‡' have been published elsewhere by the author or their estate.

Book One
34 authors, 35 stories, 214,250 words.

"Among the Beautiful Bright Children"‡ by James E. Gunn† (9100)
"Dark Night in Toyland"‡ by Bob Shaw† (4000) (withdrawn by the author's estate after his death)
"Living Inside" by Bruce Sterling (2250)
"The Bing Bang Blues" by Delbert Casada (2000)
"Ponce De Leon's Pants" by Mack Reynolds† (1800)
"The True Believer" by A. Bertram Chandler† (7000)
"The Bones Do Lie"‡ by Anne McCaffrey† (7000)
"Doug, Where Are We? I Don't Know. A Spaceship Maybe" by Grant Carrington (3800)
"Child of Mind" by Lisa Tuttle (6800)
"Dark Threshold" by P. C. Hodgell (1500)
"Falling From Grace" by Ward Moore† (4000)
"The 100 Million Horses of Planet Dada" by Daniel Walther † (both French and English versions) (4200)
"None So Deaf" by Richard E. Peck (2000)
"A Time for Praying" by G. C. Edmondson† (7700)
"The Amazonas Link" by James Sutherland (6000)
"At the Sign of the Boar's Head Nebula"‡ by Richard Wilson† (47000)
"All Creatures Great and Small" by Howard Fast† (1200)
"A Night at Madame Mephisto's" by Joseph F. Pumilia (1200)
"What Used to be Called Dead"‡ by Leslie A. Fiedler† (2800)
"Not All a Dream"‡ by Manly Wade Wellman† (5400)
"A Day in the Life of A-420" by Felix C. Gotschalk† (Jacques Goudchaux) (2600)
"The Residents of Kingston" by Doris Piserchia (5000)
"Free Enterprise"‡ by Jerry Pournelle† (11000)
"Rundown" by John Morressy† (1200)
"Various Kinds of Conceit"‡ by Arthur Byron Cover (2000)
"Son of 'Wild in the Streets'" by Robert Thom† (15800)
"Dick and Jane Go to Mars" by Wilson Tucker† (7500)
"On the Way to the Woman of Your Dreams" by Raul Judson (3800)
"Blackstop" by Gerard Conway (5500)
"Ten Times Your Fingers and Double Your Toes"‡ by Craig Strete (3500)
"The Names of Yanils"‡ by Chan Davis (9000)
"Return to Elf Hill" by Robert Lilly (900)
"The Carbon Dream"‡ by Jack Dann (9500)
"Dogs' Lives"‡ by Michael Bishop (6000) (since withdrawn by the author)

Book Two
32 authors, 40 stories, 216,527 words.

"Universe on the Turn"‡ by Ian Watson (4200) (subsequently withdrawn by the author)
"The Children of Bull Weed" by Gordon Eklund (17000) (some sources title this "The Children of Bull Wood")
"Precis of the Rappacini Report"‡ by Anthony Boucher† (850) (with an Afterword by Richard Matheson†)
"Grandma, What's the Sky Made Of?" by Susan C. Lette (1500)
"A Rousing Explanation of the Events Surrounding My Sister's Death" by David Wise (1800)
"The Dawn Patrol" by P.J. Plauger (10000)
"I Had No Head and My Eyes Were Floating Way Up in the Air"‡ by Clifford D. Simak† (6600)
"To Have and To Hold"‡ by Langdon Jones (20000)
"The Malibu Fault" by Jonathan Fast (1750)
"√-1 Think, Therefore √-1 Am" by Leonard Isaacs† (1000)
"The Taut Arc of Desire" by Philippe Curval (7200) (both French and English versions)
"A Journey South"‡ by John Christopher† (21500)
"The Return of Agent Black" by Ron Goulart (3800)
"The Stone Which the Builders Rejected" by Avram Davidson† (2000)
"Signals"‡ by Charles L. Harness† (13125)
"Thumbing it on the Beam and Other Magic Melting Moments" by D. M. Rowles (2000)
"End" by Raylyn Moore† (9250)
"Uncle Tom's Time Machine" by John Jakes (3000)
"Adversaries" by Franklin Fisher (4700)
"Copping Out" by Hank Davis (1000)
"Stark and the Star Kings"‡ by Edmond Hamilton† and Leigh Brackett† (10000)
"The Danaan Children Laugh" by Mildred Downey Broxon (5300)
"Play Sweetly, In Harmony" by Joseph Green (6300)
"Primordial Follies"‡ by Robert Sheckley† (4000)
"Cargo Run" by William E. Cochrane (18800)
"Pipeline to Paradise"‡ by Nelson S. Bond† (5000)
"Geriatric Ward"‡ by Orson Scott Card (7000)
"A Night at the Opera" by Robert Wissner (3000)
"The Red Dream" by Charles Platt (9800)
"Living Alone in the Jungle"‡ by Algis Budrys† (1352)
"The Life and the Clay" by Edgar Pangborn† (6500)

Book Three
36 authors, 38 stories, 214,200 words.

"Mama's Girl"‡ by Daniel Keyes† (4000)
"Himself in Anachron"‡ by Cordwainer Smith† (2500)
"Dreamwork, A Novel" by Pamela Zoline (16000)
"The Giant Rat of Sumatra, or By the Light of the Silvery" by the Firesign Theatre (5000)
"Leveled Best" by Steve Herbst (1300)
"Search Cycle: Beginning and Ending" by Russell Bates†
"The Last Quest" (2500)
"Fifth and Last Horseman" (5000)
"XYY" by Vonda McIntyre† (1600)
"The Accidental Ferosslk"‡ by Frank Herbert† (3500)
"The Burning Zone" by Graham Charnock (6000)
"Cacophony in Pink and Ochre" by Doris Pitkin Buck† (5500)
"The Accidents of Blood" by Frank Bryning† (5500)
"The Murderer's Song"‡ by Michael Moorcock (7500)
"On the Other Side of Space, In the Lobby of the Potlatch Inn" by Wallace West† (6500)
"Two From Kotzwinkle's Bestiary" by William Kotzwinkle (5000)
"Childfinder"‡ by Octavia E. Butler† (3250)
"Potiphee, Petey and Me" by Tom Reamy† (17000)
"The Seadragon" by Laurence Yep (17000)
"Emerging Nation" by Alfred Bester† (2000)
"Ugly Duckling Gets the Treatment and Becomes Cinderella Except Her Foot's Too Big for the Prince's Slipper and Is Webbed Besides" by Robert Thurston (3500)
"Goodbye" by Steven Utley† (2000)
"Golgotha" by Graham Hall† (3200)
"War Stories" by Edward Bryant† (10000)
"The Bellman"‡ by John Varley (11500)
"Fantasy for Six Electrodes and One Adrenaline Drip (A Play in the Form of a Feelie Script)"‡ by Joe Haldeman (10000)
"A Dog and His Boy"‡ by Harry Harrison† (4000)
"Las Animas" by Janet Nay (6800)
"False Premises" by George Alec Effinger†
"The Capitals Are Wrong" (4000)
"Stage Fright" (2500)
"Rocky Colavito Batted .268 in 1955" (5500)
"Fishing With Hemingway" (3000)
"The Senior Prom"‡ by Fred Saberhagen† (4800)
"Skin" by A. E. van Vogt† (7000)
"Halfway There" by Stan Dryer (3000)
"Love Song"‡ by Gordon R. Dickson† (6000)
"Suzy is Something Special" by Michael G. Coney† (8000)
"Previews of Hell"‡ by Jack Williamson† (3000)

Missing or withdrawn stories
The following eight stories were listed in previous published contents lists, or were known to have been submitted to Ellison for inclusion, but were not listed in the 1979 contents.

"Where Are They Now?" by Steven Bryan Bieler was sold to LDV in 1984 and withdrawn in 1988.
"The Great Forest Lawn Clearance Sale: Hurry Last Days!" by Stephen Dedman, according to the author's website.
"Squad D" by Stephen King was submitted to LDV, but possibly not accepted.
"How Dobbstown Was Saved" by Bob Leman was sold to LDV in 1981.
"The Swastika Setup" by Michael Moorcock was withdrawn and replaced by "The Murderer's Song".
"An Infinite Summer" by Christopher Priest was withdrawn in 1976.
"The Sibling" by Kit Reed† was originally sold to LDV.
"The Isle of Sinbad" by Thomas N. Scortia† was listed for inclusion in a 1973 issue of the fanzine Alien Critic but not in the Locus 1979 list.

Stories published elsewhere
Thirty-eight stories purchased for Last Dangerous Visions were published elsewhere.

 The first was Christopher Priest's "An Infinite Summer", which appeared in Andromeda 1, edited by Peter Weston and published in 1976. (As noted above, this story had been withdrawn from TLDV, and Ellison may never have purchased it.)
 "Ten Times Your Fingers and Double Your Toes" by Craig Strete (1980)
 "Primordial Follies" by Robert Sheckley (1981 in German, 1998 in Italian)
 "The Murderer's Song" by Michael Moorcock (the replacement for "The Swastika Set-Up") was first published in German translation in 1981 and appeared in the 1987 anthology Tales from the Forbidden Planet. It has since been republished several times in Moorcock's collections.
 "Universe on the Turn" by Ian Watson was published in 1984 in Last Wave and in his 1985 collection Slow Birds. 
 Michael Bishop's story "Dogs' Lives" was published in the Spring 1984 issue of The Missouri Review. It was subsequently reprinted in the 1985 edition of Best American Short Stories.
 "Signals" by Charles L. Harness (1987)
 "Dark Night in Toyland" by Bob Shaw (1988)
 "What Used to be Called Dead" by Leslie A. Fiedler (1990)
 "Living Alone in the Jungle" by Algis Budrys (1991)
 "A Journey South" by John Christopher (1991)
 "Himself in Anachron" by Cordwainer Smith (died 1966) was published in the 1993 retrospective collection of Smith's short fiction, The Rediscovery of Man. Ellison threatened to sue the New England Science Fiction Association (NESFA) for publishing the story, sold to Ellison for the anthology by Smiths widow. He later reached an amicable settlement, with a writer in Ansible guessing that Ellison had consulted the contract and discovered that he had let the rights to the story lapse because of TLDV continued delays.
 "Mama's Girl" by Daniel Keyes (1993) has, to date, only appeared in Japanese.
 Nelson Bond's contribution, "Pipeline to Paradise", saw publication in 1995 in the anthology Wheel of Fortune, edited by Roger Zelazny. It was reprinted in 2002 in Bond's second Arkham House collection, The Far Side of Nowhere. Ellison publicly acknowledged soliciting the story from Bond, who at the time had retired from writing.
 "The Bones Do Lie" by Anne McCaffrey (1995)
 "The Senior Prom" by Fred Saberhagen was included in Prom Night, an original anthology edited by Nancy Springer (and Martin H. Greenberg, uncredited). 
"Precis of the Rappacini Report" by Anthony Boucher, published as "Rappaccini's Other Daughter" in 1999.
"The Names of Yanils" by Chan Davis (1999).
Bob Leman's "How Dobbstown Was Saved" was published in Leman's 2002 collection Feesters in the Lake and Other Stories.
"Among the Beautiful Bright Children" by James E. Gunn (2002), published in Gunn's collection "Human Voices"
"A Dog and His Boy" by Harry Harrison (2002)
John Varley's "The Bellman" was published in Asimov's Science Fiction magazine in 2003, and in his collection The John Varley Reader in 2004.
In 2004, Haffner Press published a coffee-table retrospective of the works of Jack Williamson, Seventy-Five: The Diamond Anniversary of a Science Fiction Pioneer. This contains Williamson's story, "Previews of Hell".
In 2005 Haffner Press published a large reprint collection of Edmond Hamilton's two "Star Kings" novels and Leigh Brackett's three stories starring her Eric Stark character, entitled Stark and the Star Kings. The title story is the long-lost tale by both writers which should have been published in Last Dangerous Visions.
Joe Haldeman's "Fantasy for Six Electrodes and One Adrenaline Drip" (which Haldeman had believed lost until finding an old carbon copy of the manuscript) was published in his 2006 collection A Separate War and Other Stories.
Steven Bryan Bieler's story "Where Are They Now?" appeared in the Spring 2008 (Volume VII, Issue 4) online magazine Slow Trains.
In 2008, Orson Scott Card published "Geriatric Ward" in his collection of short fiction, Keeper of Dreams.
"To Have and to Hold" by Langdon Jones appeared in audio format on Episode 146 of the podcast StarShipSofa.
"The Sibling" by Kit Reed was published as "Baby Brother" in 2011.
"At the Sign of the Boar's Head Nebula" by Richard Wilson was published in 2011.
"Childfinder" by Octavia E. Butler (2014)
"The Accidental Ferosslk" by Frank Herbert was published as "The Daddy Box" in 2014.
"I Had No Head and My Eyes Were Floating Way Up In the Air" by Clifford D. Simak (2015)
"Love Song" by Gordon R. Dickson was published in "The Best of Gordon R. Dickson, Volume 1" (2017).
 "The Carbon Dream" by Jack Dann appeared in 2019 as "The Carbon Dreamer" in Shivers VIII from Cemetery Dance Publications. The same anthology also includes "Squad D", a Stephen King submission to The Last Dangerous Visions which Ellison had rejected. 
"Various Kinds of Conceits" by Arthur Byron Cover was included The Unquiet Dreamer, a 2019 tribute to Harlan Ellison from PS Publishing. The same anthology also includes Steve Rasnic Tem's "The Thin Silver Line".
"Free Enterprise" by Jerry Pournelle was published in the 2019 Baen Books collection The Best of Jerry Pournelle under the title "The Last Shot".
"Not All a Dream" by Manly Wade Wellman will be issued as a chapbook to customers preordering the two volume Haffner Press The Complete John the Balladeer.

See also
Development Hell
Vaporware

References

External links 

 3
Works edited by Harlan Ellison
American anthologies
Science fiction anthologies
Upcoming books